"The Tiger of San Pedro" is a jazz song by John LaBarbera, made popular by trombonist Bill Watrous.  It was the title song of the Grammy-nominated Columbia recording "Tiger of San Pedro" by Watrous' band, The Manhattan Wildlife Refuge. 

The title is based on a character in one of the 56 short stories featuring Sherlock Holmes. Don Juan Murillo is a deposed dictator from Central America, formerly known as "The Tiger of San Pedro", living in England, in the story "The Adventure of Wisteria Lodge".

References

Tiger of San Pedro
Year of song missing